The Cooma Back Creek, a mostlyperennial river that is part of the Murrumbidgee catchment within the Murray–Darling basin, is located in the Monaro region of New South Wales, Australia.

Course and features 

The Cooma Back Creek descends  over its  course.

The Snowy Mountains Highway crosses Cooma Back Creek in Cooma.

See also 

 List of rivers of New South Wales (A-K)
 Rivers of New South Wales

References

External links
Upper Murrumbidgee Demonstration Reach  1.22MB
 

Rivers of New South Wales
Tributaries of the Murrumbidgee River
Snowy Mountains Highway
Snowy Monaro Regional Council